Daniel G. Clodfelter (born June 2, 1950) is an American politician and attorney from North Carolina. He served as a Democratic member of the North Carolina General Assembly representing the State's thirty-seventh Senate district, which includes constituents in Mecklenburg County, from January 1999 through April 8, 2014, when he resigned after being appointed Mayor of Charlotte, North Carolina.

Education and legal career

Clodfelter was born in Thomasville, North Carolina and graduated from Thomasville Senior High School, after attending one of the first sessions of the Governor's School of North Carolina in 1966. He earned a bachelor's degree from Davidson College, where he was a brother of Sigma Phi Epsilon fraternity.

In 1972 and was named a Rhodes Scholar and earned another bachelor's degree from Oxford University in 1974. He then attended the Yale Law School, earning his J.D. degree in 1977. Clodfelter served as a law clerk for Judge James B. McMillan of the U.S. District Court for the Western District of N.C. from 1977–78, after which he entered private practice in Charlotte.

Political career
Clodfelter served as a member of the Charlotte City Council, representing District One (East Charlotte) from 1987 to 1993. Clodfelter was elected to the North Carolina Senate in 1998 and for many years served as Co-Chair of the powerful Senate Finance Committee and as Vice Chair of the Judiciary One Committee. Clodfelter has been a Trustee of the Z. Smith Reynolds Foundation since 1982.

Mayor of Charlotte
After Charlotte Mayor Patrick Cannon resigned from his office on 26 March 2014, several members of the Charlotte City Council expressed their support for Clodfelter to fill out Cannon's term. His appointment as mayor was endorsed by The Charlotte Observer. On April 7, 2014, the City Council appointed Clodfelter as mayor. He resigned as a member of the North Carolina Senate on April 8, and was sworn in as mayor of Charlotte on April 9. He ran for a full term in 2015 but was defeated in the primary by Jennifer Roberts.

Family
Daniel Clodfelter is married to Elizabeth K. Bevan; they have two adult children.

See also
 List of mayors of the largest 50 US cities

References

External links
North Carolina General Assembly (official site)
N.C Bar Association Bio
Moore Van Allen News
Moore Van Allen Bio
Z.Smith Reynolds Foundation

|-

|-

1950 births
Living people
Democratic Party North Carolina state senators
North Carolina lawyers
Davidson College alumni
Mayors of Charlotte, North Carolina
Charlotte, North Carolina City Council members
21st-century American politicians